The 2021–22 División de Honor was the 55th season of the División de Honor, the top flight of  Spanish domestic rugby union.

Competition format

The season took place between October and May.  

The league format was altered for the 2021-22 season. The twelve teams were split into two groups of 6, based on their placings in last season's league.

Teams played the other teams in their group twice, and then played a further six games against teams from the other group, making a total of 16 games.

The teams were all classified in the same table, with the top eight sides qualifying for the playoffs to decide the champion.

Points were awarded as follows:
4 points for a win
2 points for a draw
1 bonus point is awarded to a team scoring 4 tries or more in a match
1 bonus point is awarded to a team that loses a match by 7 points or fewer

Promotion and relegation 
The second-tier División de Honor B is made up of three regional groups. The top eight teams across the three groups play off; the champion is promoted to División de Honor, at the expense of the team which finishes last in the División de Honor. 

The runner-up plays a further play-off against the team which finishes 11th in the top flight.

Teams
Relegated sides Independiente and Getxo were replaced by La Vila and Gernika.

Results

Standings

Playoffs
The playoffs were played on the 15 May 2022, with the exception of Alcobendas vs. Cisneros, which was postponed due to ongoing investigations in the Gavin Van den Berg affair. The Spanish rugby federation finally disqualified Alcobendas on the 26 May 2022, meaning Cisneros earned a bye to the semifinals.

Copa del Rey
The twelve teams were divided into four groups of three. The winner of each group proceeded to the semifinals of the cup, which were one-legged ties.

The draw for the cup groups was restricted to ensure that teams are in the same group as well. This enabled specified league games to also count as cup group games. 

Group 1: Barcelona, El Salvador, La Vila

Group 2: Ordizia, Les Abelles, Valladolid

Group 3: Santboiana, Lexus Alcobendas, Complutense Cisneros

Group 4: Gernika, Ciencias, Aparejadores

Although Alcobendas won a place in the final, they were eliminated from the competition as a result of the Van der Berg affair and were replaced in the final by Ciencias. Due to the prolonged investigation into Alcobendas, it was not possible to schedule the final before the off-season began, and the final was delayed until September 25 2022.

References

External links
Official site

Rugby union in Spain
2021-22